Sir Arthur Onslow, 1st Baronet (1622 – 21 July 1688) was an English politician who sat in the House of Commons at various times between 1641 and 1685.

Life
Onslow was the eldest son of Sir Richard Onslow and was baptised on 23 April 1622. His father was an important Parliamentarian from Surrey during the Civil War. Onslow was educated at Queen's College, Oxford in 1639 and at Lincoln's Inn in 1640.

In 1641, Onslow was elected Member of Parliament for Bramber in the Long Parliament. He took an active role in political affairs during the English Civil War. In 1654 he was elected MP for Surrey in the First Protectorate Parliament and was re-elected in 1656 for the Second Protectorate Parliament, and in 1659 for the Third Protectorate Parliaments. In 1660, he was elected MP for Guildford in the Convention Parliament. He was re-elected MP for Surrey in 1661 for the Cavalier Parliament.

On 8 May 1674, Onslow obtained a patent in reversion to succeed to his father-in-law Thomas Foote's baronetcy upon his death without heirs, with the precedence of the original creation. He became, therefore, a baronet upon Foote's death in 1687, but died less than a year later, and was succeeded by his eldest son Richard.

Family
Onslow's first wife was Rose Stoughton (d. 1647), daughter of Nicholas Stoughton, by whom he had no children. His second wife was Mary Foote, daughter of Sir Thomas Foote, a wealthy London grocer created a baronet in 1660. By her he had several children, including:
Richard (1654–1717), became Baron Onslow, Speaker of the House of Commons (1708–1710), Lord Treasurer, Chancellor of the Exchequer, etc. He married Elizabeth daughter of Henry Tulse, and had Thomas, 2nd Lord Onslow.
Foot Onslow (born 1655, died 11 May 1710), who was Commissioner of Excise (1694–1710).
Arthur, who died unmarried.
Henry, who died unmarried.
Mary, who married Sri Robert Reeve of Thwair.
Catherine Onslow (d. 14 March 1731), married Sir William Clerke of Shabbington. 
Elizabeth, who died unmarried.

Notes

References
 
 

1622 births
1688 deaths
Baronets in the Baronetage of England
English MPs 1640–1648
English MPs 1654–1655
English MPs 1656–1658
English MPs 1659
English MPs 1660
English MPs 1661–1679
English MPs 1679
English MPs 1680–1681
English MPs 1681
Alumni of The Queen's College, Oxford
Members of Lincoln's Inn
Arthur, 1st Baronet